The Venus of Montmartre (German:Die Venus vom Montmartre or Die Venus von Montmartre) is a 1925 German silent drama film directed by Frederic Zelnik and starring Lya Mara, Hans Albers, Jack Trevor, and Olga Tschechowa.

Cast
In alphabetical order
 Hans Albers as Tricotin
 Hugo Döblin as Mouchu
 Karl Harbacher as The Musician
 Lya Mara as Joujou
 Heinrich Peer as Count Sullivan
 Hermann Picha as The Painter
 Karl Platen as Mon. Frossart
 Hans Hermann Schaufuß as The Writer
 Jack Trevor as Prince of Chéran
 Olga Tschechowa as Countess Sullivan

References

Bibliography
 Grange, William. Cultural Chronicle of the Weimar Republic. Scarecrow Press, 2008.

External links

1925 films
Films of the Weimar Republic
Films directed by Frederic Zelnik
German silent feature films
1925 drama films
German drama films
Films set in Paris
German black-and-white films
Silent drama films
1920s German films